Devoto can refer to:

Places
 Devoto Palace, a former mansion in Buenos Aires
 Villa Devoto, a district in Buenos Aires, Argentina

People
 Antonio Devoto, the historic landlord of Villa Devoto
 Howard Devoto, British musician, member of the Buzzcocks and the ShelleyDevoto collaboration with Pete Shelley
 Giacomo Devoto, Italian linguist
 Ollie Devoto, English rugby union player

When capitalized as DeVoto, it can refer to:

 Avis DeVoto, American culinary editor, book reviewer, and cook
 Bernard DeVoto, American historian and author
 Mark DeVoto, American professor emeritus of music at Tufts University